Radisson Blu Edwardian Vanderbilt Hotel is a boutique hotel at 68–86 Cromwell Road in the Royal Borough of Kensington and Chelsea, central London. The hotel, located in a Grade II listed terrace of white stucco townhouses, contains 215 rooms and is owned and operated by Radisson Hotels. The hotel contains the Scoff & Banter Kensington restaurant on the ground floor.

History
The hotel was purchased in 1978 and in 1993 Edwardian Hotels partnered with Radisson to become the Radisson Edwardian Hotels group. In 1998 the hotel was completely refurbished and it became a four-star hotel.

Architecture

This Grade II listed building was originally home to the Vanderbilt family  Gilded Age 'American royalty.'

Radisson Blu Edwardian Vanderbilt Hotel consists of ten townhouses knocked into one, and contains frescoes, richly adorned ceilings, wood panelling and stained glass windows. The decor is described as being "minimalist", with "neutral grey, white and yellow tones". The lobby has a marble fireplace with a large stone statue of a hare and a black and white tiled floor. The bedrooms contain handcrafted Vispring mattresses.

According to Architect Magazine, a retractable roof was added to the hotel’s rooftop terrace in 2015 by Ettwein Bridges Architects and Architect Tony Hogg Design Ltd., with Tenara Fabric and Sefar Architecture.

Restaurants
The hotel contains the Scoff & Banter Kensington restaurant. formerly the 68–86 Bar and Restaurant, also known as Bar 86, an upmarket bar and restaurant which serves British cuisine with "Pacific Rim" influences. The interior has been described as having "wooden floors and unusual objects of art".  The decor was refitted in 2014.

References

Further reading

Buildings and structures in the Royal Borough of Kensington and Chelsea
Grade II listed buildings in the Royal Borough of Kensington and Chelsea
Hotels in London
Radisson Blu
Restaurants in the Royal Borough of Kensington and Chelsea
Vanderbilt family residences
Grade II listed hotels